The Tuck School of Dartmouth College has approximately 10,300 living alumni globally. This is a list of notable Tuck School alumni.

This list uses the following notation:
D or unmarked years – recipient of Dartmouth College Bachelor of Arts
DMS – recipient of Dartmouth Medical School degree (Bachelor of Medicine 1797–1812, Doctor of Medicine 1812–present)
Th – recipient of any of several Thayer School of Engineering degrees (see Thayer School of Engineering#Academics)
T – recipient of Tuck School of Business Master of Business Administration, or graduate of other programs as indicated
M.A., M.A.L.S., M.S., Ph.D, etc. – recipient of indicated degree from an Arts and Sciences graduate program, or the historical equivalent

Industry

Finance

 John P. Costas (born 1957), American businessman, banker, and trader

Technology

Government, law and nonprofit

Media

Real estate

Writers

Music

Academia

Sports

See also 
 :Category:Dartmouth College alumni

References

Tuck School of Business